Regional Railways was one of the three passenger sectors of British Rail created in 1982 that existed until 1997, two years after privatisation. The sector was originally called Provincial.

Regional Railways was the most subsidised (per passenger km) of the three sectors. Upon formation, its costs were four times its revenue.

The sector was broken up into eight franchises during the privatisation of British Rail and ceased to exist on 31 March 1997.

Formation
Upon sectorisation in 1982, three passenger sectors were created: InterCity, operating principal express services; London & South East (renamed Network SouthEast in 1986) operating commuter services in the London area, and Provincial (renamed Regional Railways in 1989) responsible for all other passenger services.  In the metropolitan counties, local services were managed by the Passenger Transport Executives.

Services

Regional Railways inherited a diverse range of routes, comprising both express and local services. Expresses mainly ran to non-principal destinations or on less popular routes, such as Birmingham or Liverpool to Norwich, or Liverpool to Scarborough, and were chiefly operated by older locomotives and second-hand InterCity coaches. Later these services were operated by Sprinter units – mainly Class 158s on express services. There were also the internal Scottish Region local services and expresses, the latter including the Edinburgh-Glasgow push-pull service.

Local services ran on both main lines and branch lines and were often operated by first generation diesel multiple units dating back to the 1950s. Longer distance trains were often formed of older coaches and locomotives of Class 31, Class 40, and Class 45, which were of similar vintage.

Development of new rolling stock
In the early 1980s, large numbers of diesel multiple unit (DMU) and locomotive-hauled coaches were found to contain asbestos. Removing this would be a considerable cost and generating no extra revenue, which, coupled with the increasingly unreliable old locomotives and DMUs, prompted BR to look for a new generation of diesel multiple units.

The prototype Class 210s, in service on a trial basis since 1981, were considered too expensive to be put into production, so BR looked elsewhere for new designs.

Pacers
The first, Pacers, used bus technology from the Leyland National, in classes numbered in the 14X range. Not long after introduction to service, large numbers of them suffered from a number of technical problems, particularly with their gearboxes. In Cornwall it was found that their long wheelbase caused intolerable squealing noises and high tyre wear on tight curves, and they quickly had to be replaced by the old DMUs. The solution lay elsewhere, although, after much modification, the Pacers eventually proved themselves in traffic.

Sprinters
 BR needed something midway between the Pacers and the Class 210s. In 1984/1985, two experimental DMU designs were put into service: the British Rail Engineering Limited built Class 150 and Metro-Cammell built Class 151. Both of these used hydraulic transmission and were less bus-like than the Pacers. After trials, Class 150 was selected for production, entering service from 1987. Reliability was much improved by the new units, with depot visits being reduced from two or three times a week to fortnightly.

The late 1980s and early 1990s also saw the development of secondary express services that complemented the mainline Intercity routes. Class 155 and Class 156 Sprinters were developed to replace locomotive-hauled trains on these services, their interiors being designed with longer distance journeys in mind. Key Scottish and Trans-Pennine routes were upgraded with new Class 158 Express Sprinters, while a network of 'Alphaline' services was introduced elsewhere in the country.

By the end of the 1980s, passenger numbers had increased and costs had been reduced to two-and-a-half times revenue.

Electrification

The British Rail Class 323 electric multiple units were built by Hunslet Transportation Projects between 1992 and 1995, although mock-ups and prototypes were built and tested in 1990 and 1991. Forty-three 3-car units were built for inner-suburban services in and around Birmingham and Manchester, including the Cross-City Line in the Birmingham area and services to the new Manchester Airport railway station.

Rolling Stock

Livery

Initially, many vehicles carried standard British Rail blue livery.

From 1986, Provincial adopted a version of the prototype Class 150 livery: aircraft blue over white, with a light blue stripe at waist level. All new units, plus a few existing ones, such as selected Class 304 EMUs, received it. Some units and coaches received the livery with either ScotRail or Regional Railways branding.

The Class 158s, introduced in 1989, appeared in Express livery: dark grey window surrounds over light grey, with light and dark blue stripes at waist level. This colour scheme was also applied to some Class 156 units around privatisation.

The Class 323 EMUs introduced in 1994 appeared in the West Midlands Passenger Transport Executive (Centro) livery for the West Midlands based sets, and the Greater Manchester Passenger Transport Executive (GMPTE) livery for Manchester-based sets.

After privatisation, many vehicles continued to carry the basic RR colour scheme but with the addition of different branding, e.g. Central Trains.

The final British railway vehicle to carry Regional Railways livery was a Class 153, which was repainted in July 2008 into East Midlands Trains livery.

Split for privatisation
As part of the process of privatisation between 1994 and 1997, Regional Railways was split into several different shadow train operating units, which later became independent train operating companies:

References

Further reading

External links

 Regional Railways Identity Management – internal branding manual, 1992

British Rail brands
British Rail passenger services